Parimal Dey (4 May 1941 – 1 February 2023) was an Indian footballer who played as a forward. He played for the India national team, representing the country in the 1966 Asian Games in Bangkok and the 1966 Merdeka Tournament in Malaysia. In a domestic career spanning twelve years between 1962 and 1974, he represented the big two Calcutta football clubs, East Bengal FC and Mohun Bagan FC, mostly with East Bengal and was considered one of the finest forwards of his time. Parimal Dey won the IFA Shield four times, the Durand Cup twice, and the Rovers Cup thrice while representing East Bengal.

He appeared with East Bengal from 1964 to 1970 and again in 1973 and captained the team in 1968–69. He received the lifetime achievement award from East Bengal in 2014 and the Banga Bhushan award by the Government of West Bengal in 2019. Dey died in Kolkata on 1 February 2023, at the age of 81.

Club career 
Parimal Dey made his club debut with Bali Prativa in the year 1962. He signed for Wari the following season and then was roped in by East Bengal in 1964. He spent seven continuous seasons with East Bengal, captaining the side in 1968. He moved to Mohun Bagan in 1971 and after spending two seasons, returned to East Bengal in 1973 before taking retirement from football.

Amongst his best experiences was a 1970 IFA Shield Final where his last-minute goal helped East Bengal defeat PAS Tehran 1–0 at the Eden Gardens. He was also the captain of the West Bengal team in the 1968 Santosh Trophy.

Dey received the lifetime achievement award from East Bengal in 2014.

International career 
Parimal Dey made his debut for the India national team in 1966 in the 1966 Asian Games in Bangkok. He also scored the goal against South Korea in the 1966 Merdeka Tournament bronze medal match.

Honours
East Bengal
Calcutta Football League: 1966, 1970, 1973
IFA Shield: 1965, 1966, 1970, 1973
Rovers Cup: 1967, 1969, 1973
Durand Cup: 1977, 1970

Mohun Bagan
Rovers Cup: 1971

See also
 List of SC East Bengal captains

References

Bibliography

 
 

Bandyopadhyay, Santipriya (1979). Cluber Naam East Bengal . Kolkata: New Bengal Press.
Chattopadhyay, Hariprasad (2017). Mohun Bagan–East Bengal . Kolkata: Parul Prakashan.

Further reading

External links

1941 births
2023 deaths
Indian footballers
India international footballers
Footballers from West Bengal
Association football wingers
Footballers at the 1966 Asian Games
Asian Games competitors for India
Mohun Bagan AC players
East Bengal Club players